Senan Declan Clint van der Merwe (born 2 February 1986) is a South African professional rugby union player, who most recently played with the . His regular position is winger.

Career

Youth and amateur rugby

Van der Merwe represented the  side in the 2006 and 2007 editions of the Under-21 Provincial Championship. He then played club rugby for local amateur side Robertson until 2011.

Boland Cavaliers

In 2012, he was included in the  squad for the 2012 Vodacom Cup. He made his first class debut by coming on as a late replacement in their first match of the season, a 22–51 defeat to Western Cape rivals . He also started their next match, a 27–30 defeat to defending champions, Argentine side  and scored his first try in a senior match when he dotted down just before half-time.

Boland eventually finished sixth to miss out on a semi-final play-off berth, with Van der Merwe making eleven appearances.

They performed slightly better in the 2013 Currie Cup First Division, finishing fifth and just outside a semi-final spot.

References

South African rugby union players
Living people
1986 births
People from Robertson, Western Cape
Rugby union wings
Boland Cavaliers players
Rugby union players from the Western Cape